Carex cilicica is a tussock-forming species of perennial sedge in the family Cyperaceae. It is native to parts of the Middle East.

See also
List of Carex species

References

cilicica
Taxa named by Pierre Edmond Boissier
Plants described in 1859
Flora of Iran
Flora of Iraq
Flora of Turkey